Pyrgula is a genus of freshwater snail with a gill and an operculum, an aquatic gastropod mollusk in the family Hydrobiidae.

Pyrgula is the type genus of the subfamily Pyrgulinae. Pyrgula annulata is the type species of the genus Pyrgula.

Species
Species within the genus Pyrgula include:

 Pyrgula abichi Logvinenko & Starobogatov, 1968
 Pyrgula acicula A. & P. Reischutz, 2002
 † Pyrgula acuticarinata Pavlović, 1932 
 Pyrgula aenigma Logvinenko & Starobogatov, 1968
 † Pyrgula andrusovi Pavlović, 1903 
 † Pyrgula angulata Fuchs, 1870  
 † Pyrgula angulataeformis Jekelius, 1932 
 Pyrgula annulata (Linnaeus, 1758) - type species
 Pyrgula annulata annulata (Linnaeus, 1758)
 Pyrgula annulata dalmatica Schutt, 1968
 Pyrgula archimedis Fuchs, 1870 
 † Pyrgula aspera Brusina, 1878 
 † Pyrgula atava Brusina, 1881 
 † Pyrgula baccata Brusina, 1878 
 Pyrgula bakuana (Kolesnikov, 1947)
 Pyrgula basalis (B. Dybowski & J. Grochmalicki, 1915)
 Pyrgula behningi Logvinenko & Starobogatov, 1968
 † Pyrgula bicarinata Brusina, 1902 
 † Pyrgula bicincta Lörenthey, 1894 
 † Pyrgula boettgeri Brusina, 1897
 † Pyrgula boteniensis Wenz, 1942 
 † Pyrgula capellinii Wenz, 1919 
 † Pyrgula carrarai Brusina, 1902 
 † Pyrgula cerithiolum Brusina, 1881 
 Pyrgula cincta (Abich, 1859)
 Pyrgula columna Logvinenko & Starobogatov, 1968
 Pyrgula concinna Logvinenko & Starobogatov, 1968
 † Pyrgula conica Taner, 1974 
 † Pyrgula crispata Brusina, 1881 
 Pyrgula curta (Naliwkin, 1914)
 † Pyrgula dacica Jekelius, 1932 
 † Pyrgula dalmatina Brusina, 1881 
 † Pyrgula dautzenbergi (Morgan, 1915)
 Pyrgula derzhavini Logvinenko & Starobogatov, 1968
 Pyrgula dimidiata (Eichwald, 1838)
 Pyrgula dubia Logvinenko & Starobogatov, 1968
 Pyrgula ebersini Logvinenko & Starobogatov, 1968
 † Pyrgula elegans Jekelius, 1932
 † Pyrgula elegantissima (Frauenfeld, 1864) 
 Pyrgula eulimellula (B. Dybowski & J. Grochmalicki, 1915)
 Pyrgula falkneri A. & P. Reischutz, 2002
 Pyrgula fedorovi Logvinenko & Starobogatov, 1968
 † Pyrgula gladilini Pavlović, 1932 
 Pyrgula grimmi (Clessin & W. Dybowski in W. Dybowski, 1888)
 † Pyrgula hungarica Lörenthey, 1894 
 † Pyrgula incisa Fuchs, 1870 
 † Pyrgula interrupta Brusina, 1878 
 Pyrgula isseli Logvinenko & Starobogatov, 1968
 Pyrgula kolesnikoviana Logvinenko & Starobogatov in Golikov & Starobogatov, 1966
 † Pyrgula konstantinovici Pavlović, 1932 
 Pyrgula kowalewskii (Clessin & W. Dybowski in W. Dybowski, 1888)
 † Pyrgula krejcii Wenz in Krejci-Graf & Wenz, 1932 
 † Pyrgula laevissima de Stefani, 1877
 † Pyrgula laminatocarinata (Andrusov, 1890) 
 † Pyrgula laskarevi Pavlović, 1927 
 Pyrgula lencoranica Logvinenko & Starobogatov, 1968
 Pyrgula lirata (B. Dybowski & J. Grochmalicki, 1915)
 † Pyrgula malcevici Brusina, 1893 
 Pyrgula marginata (Westerlund, 1902)
 † Pyrgula martini Pavlović, 1932 
 † Pyrgula marulici Brusina, 1902 
 † Pyrgula mathildaeformis Fuchs, 1870 
 Pyrgula nana Logvinenko & Starobogatov, 1968
 † Pyrgula nodotiana Tournouër, 1866 
 Pyrgula nossovi (Kolesnikov, 1947)
 Pyrgula pallasii (Clessin & W. Dybowski in W. Dybowski, 1888)
 Pyrgula pambotis A. & P. Reischutz, 2002
 Pyrgula prahovensis Papaianopol & Macaleț, 2004 
 † Pyrgula prisca (Neumayr in Herbich & Neumayr, 1875) 
 Pyrgula pseudobacuana Logvinenko & Starobogatov, 1968
 Pyrgula pseudodimidiata (B. Dybowski & Grochmalicki, 1915)
 Pyrgula pseudospica Logvinenko & Starobogatov, 1968
 Pyrgula pulla (B. Dybowski & Grochmalicki, 1915)
 † Pyrgula purpurina Andrusov, 1890 
 † Pyrgula radici Pavlović, 1927
 † Pyrgula radovanovici Pavlović, 1903 
 † Pyrgula raskovici Pavlović, 1903 
 † Pyrgula reljkovici Brusina, 1902 
 Pyrgula rudis Logvinenko & Starobogatov, 1968
 † Pyrgula rusti Neubauer, Harzhauser, Georgopoulou, Mandic & Kroh, 2014 
 Pyrgula schorygini Logvinenko & Starobogatov, 1968
 † Pyrgula sergii Brusina, 1902 
 † Pyrgula serratula Brusina, 1897 
 Pyrgula sieversi (Clessin in W. Dybowski, 1888)
 Pyrgula sieversi (O. Boettger, 1881)
 Pyrgula similis Logvinenko & Starobogatov, 1968
 Pyrgula simplex Logvinenko & Starobogatov, 1968
 Pyrgula sowinskyi Logvinenko & Starobogatov, 1968
 † Pyrgula subarchimedis Friedberg, 1923 
 † Pyrgula syrmica Brusina, 1892 
 † Pyrgula tessellata Brusina, 1897 
 Pyrgula turkmenica Logvinenko & Starobogatov, 1968
 † Pyrgula turricula (Neumayr in Neumayr & Paul, 1875) 
 Pyrgula ulskii (Clessin & W. Dybowski in W. Dybowski, 1888)
 † Pyrgula unicarinata Brusina, 1902 
 Pyrgula uralensis Logvinenko & Starobogatov, 1968

References

 Tournouër, R. (1869). Description du nouveau genre Pyrgidium et de deux espèces fossiles des terrains d'eau douce du département de la Côte-d'Or. Journal de Conchyliologie. 17, 86-95.

External links 
 AnimalBase info on one species

Hydrobiidae